Efenechtyd is a hamlet and community in a deep valley in Denbighshire, Wales which contains the Church of St Michael and All Angels. The community includes the village of Pwllglas. Efenechtyd is also the name of an electoral ward.

Governance
The Efenechtyd electoral ward elects a county councillor to site on Denbighshire County Council. This ward stretches to the south-west of Efenechtyd with a total population taken at the 2011 census of 1,686, the community population being 655.

Church of St Michael and All Angels
St Michael's is the tiny church of Efenechtyd. At twenty feet wide, St Michael's is the second smallest church in the diocese of St Asaph.
 
The circular churchyard suggests Celtic origins. The church may have been founded by monks from St Saeran's at Llanynys and probably dates from the 13th century. The east window probably dates from c. 1400.

The church's most notable feature is its rare medieval wooden font, probably of 15th or 16th-century origin, similar to the stone fonts fashionable at that time. It is made from a single circular oak block with fourteen facets over a ring of beading. Similarly the battlemented rail near the altar is also late medieval and part of a rood screen. Another notable feature includes a fragment of a Welsh wall-painted Ten Commandments, probably Elizabethan or Jacobean. Monuments include a painted timber memorial to Catherine Lloyd (1810) and a Georgian monument to Joseph Conway of Plas-yn-Llan, near the churchyard gate.

The church was extensively restored in 1873.

The rounded stone by the font is the ‘Maen Camp’, formerly used at the local ‘campau’ (‘Sports’) on St. Michael's Day, 29 September.  Village Samsons strove to hurl it backwards over their heads.

The custom of throwing the Feat Stone has been revived in recent years and takes place at the Harvest Festival celebrations.

References

Living Paths

Populated places in Denbighshire
Wards of Denbighshire